Unprotected is a 1916 American drama silent film directed by James Young, written by James Hatton, and starring Blanche Sweet, Theodore Roberts, Ernest Joy, Tom Forman, Walter Long and Mrs. Lewis McCord. It was released on November 6, 1916 (US), by Paramount Pictures.

Cast 
Blanche Sweet as Barbara King
Theodore Roberts as Rufus Jamison
 Lydia Jasmin Unsworth Lola Faith Richardson
Ernest Joy as Gov. John Carroll
Tom Forman as Gordon Carroll
Walter Long as Joshua Craig
Mrs. Lewis McCord as Convict Mattie Rowe
Robert Gray as Tony Salvarro
Jane Wolfe as The Mulatto

References

External links 
 

1916 films
1910s English-language films
Silent American drama films
1916 drama films
Paramount Pictures films
Films directed by James Young
American black-and-white films
American silent feature films
1910s American films